The Academy Award for Best Adapted Screenplay is the Academy Award for the best screenplay adapted from previously established material. The most frequently adapted media are novels, but other adapted narrative formats include stage plays, musicals, short stories, TV series, and even other films and film characters. All sequels are also considered adaptations by this standard (based on the story and characters set forth in the original film).

Prior to its current name, this award had been known as the Academy Award for Best Screenplay Based On Material From Another Medium.

See also the Academy Award for Best Original Screenplay, the corresponding award for scripts with original stories.

Superlatives
The first person to win twice in this category was Joseph L. Mankiewicz, who won the award in two consecutive years, 1949 and 1950. Others to win twice in this category include: George Seaton, Robert Bolt (who also won in consecutive years), Francis Ford Coppola, Mario Puzo, Alvin Sargent, Ruth Prawer Jhabvala, Michael Wilson, Alexander Payne and Christopher Hampton. Payne won both awards as part of a writing team, with Jim Taylor for Sideways and Jim Rash and Nat Faxon for The Descendants. Michael Wilson was blacklisted at the time of his second Oscar, so the award was given to a front (novelist Pierre Boulle). However, the Academy officially recognized him as the winner several years later.

Billy Wilder, Charles Brackett, Paddy Chayefsky, Francis Ford Coppola, Horton Foote, William Goldman, Robert Benton, Bo Goldman, Waldo Salt, and the Coen brothers have won Oscars for both original and adapted screenplays.

Frances Marion (The Big House) was the first woman to win in the category.

Pierre Collings and Sheridan Gibney (The Story of Louis Pasteur) were the first to win for adapting their own work.

Philip G. Epstein and Julius J. Epstein (Casablanca) are the first siblings to win in this category. James Goldman (The Lion in Winter) and William Goldman (Butch Cassidy and the Sundance Kid and All the President's Men) are the first siblings to win for separate films. Joel Coen and Ethan Coen (No Country for Old Men) are the third winning siblings.

Mario Puzo is the one of two writers whose work has been adapted and resulted in two wins. Puzo's novel The Godfather resulted in wins in 1972 and 1974 for himself and Francis Ford Coppola. The other is E. M. Forster, whose novels A Room with a View and Howards End resulted in wins for Ruth Prawer Jhabvala.

Larry McMurtry is the only person who has won for adapting someone else's work (Brokeback Mountain), and whose own work has been adapted by someone else, resulting in a win (Terms of Endearment.

William Monahan (The Departed and Sian Heder (CODA) are the only people who have won this award by using another full-length feature film as the credited source of the adaptation.

Peter Jackson and Fran Walsh (The Lord of the Rings: The Return of the King) are the only couple to win.

Geoffrey S. Fletcher (Precious) and John Ridley (12 Years a Slave) are the only African-Americans to win solo in this category; Fletcher is also the first African-American to win in any writing category. Barry Jenkins and Tarell Alvin McCraney (Moonlight are the first African-American writing duo to win; Spike Lee and Kevin Willmott (BlacKkKlansman) are the second, although their co-writers, David Rabinowitz and Charlie Wachtel, are both white.

James Ivory (Call Me by Your Name) is the oldest person to receive the award at age 89. Charlie Wachtel (BlacKkKlansman) is the youngest at age 32.

Taika Waititi (Jojo Rabbit is the first person of Māori descent to receive the award.

Emma Thompson (Sense and Sensibility) is the only winner who has also won for acting. Winners Billy Bob Thornton (Sling Blade) and John Huston (The Treasure of the Sierra Madre) have been nominated for acting but not won.

Charles Schnee (The Bad and the Beautiful, Billy Bob Thornton (Sling Blade), and Bill Condon (Gods and Monsters) are the only winners whose films were not nominated for Best Picture.

Notable nominees
Noted novelists and playwrights nominated in this category include: George Bernard Shaw (who shared an award for an adaptation of his play Pygmalion), Graham Greene, Tennessee Williams, Vladimir Nabokov, James Hilton, Dashiell Hammett, Raymond Chandler, Lillian Hellman, Irwin Shaw, James Agee, Norman Corwin, S. J. Perelman, Terence Rattigan, John Osborne, Robert Bolt, Harold Pinter, David Mamet, Larry McMurtry, Arthur Miller, John Irving, David Hare, Tony Kushner, August Wilson and Florian Zeller.

Ted Elliott, Roger S. H. Schulman, Joe Stillman & Terry Rossio, writers of Shrek and Michael Arndt, John Lasseter, Andrew Stanton & Lee Unkrich, writers of Toy Story 3, are as of 2020, the only writers to be nominated for an animated film.

Scott Frank, James Mangold & Michael Green, writers of Logan, are the first writers to be nominated for a film based on superhero comic books (the X-Men).

Winners and nominees
Winners are listed first in colored row, followed by the other nominees.

1920s

1930s

1940s

1950s

1960s

1970s

1980s

1990s

2000s

2010s

2020s

Writers with multiple awards
2 Awards
Robert Bolt
Francis Ford Coppola
Christopher Hampton
Ruth Prawer Jhabvala
Joseph L. Mankiewicz
Alexander Payne
Mario Puzo
Michael Wilson
Alvin Sargent
George Seaton

Writers with multiple nominations
The following writers have received three or more nominations:

7 Nominations
Billy Wilder

6 Nominations
John Huston
Eric Roth

5 Nominations
Richard Brooks

4 Nominations
Michael Wilson
Carl Foreman
Albert Hackett
Frances Goodrich
Julius J. Epstein
Stanley Kubrick
Joel Coen
Ethan Coen
Steven Zaillian

3 Nominations
Joseph L. Mankiewicz
Ernest Lehman
Robert Bolt
Neil Simon
Francis Ford Coppola
Alexander Payne
Ruth Prawer Jhabvala
Oliver Stone
Aaron Sorkin
Christopher Hampton

Age superlatives

See also
 Golden Globe Award for Best Screenplay
 BAFTA Award for Best Adapted Screenplay
 Independent Spirit Award for Best Screenplay
 Critics' Choice Movie Award for Best Screenplay
 List of Big Five Academy Award winners and nominees
 Writers Guild of America Award for Best Adapted Screenplay

Notes

References

Adapted Screenplay
 
Screenwriting awards for film
Awards established in 1929